The Saint-Germain River is a tributary of the Saint-François River. It flows in Drummond Regional County Municipality (MRC), north-west in the administrative region of Centre-du-Québec, on the South Shore of the Saint Lawrence River, in Quebec, Canada. This river crosses the municipalities of: l'Avenir, Durham-Sud, Lefebvre, Wickham, Saint-Germain-de-Grantham and Drummondville.

Geography 

The main neighboring hydrographic slopes of the Saint-Germain river are:
 north side: Saint-François River;
 east side: Saint-François River;
 south side: Ulverton River;
 west side: David River, rivière le Renne, Yamaska River.

The Saint-Germain river draws its water from the heads of various streams flowing in agricultural zones and crossing some forest islets, in the municipality of L'Avenir.

Upper course of the river (segment of )

The Saint-Germain river flows in an agricultural zone on:
  towards the south in the zone up to the municipality limit of the municipality of Durham-Sud (i.e. the extension of the Rang 8e road);
  west to Mcgineney Road;
  northwesterly, to Route Ployart which constitutes the southeastern limit of Lefebvre;
  west, to Caya road;
  northwesterly, along more or less a segment of the ninth rang road, in the municipality of Wickham, and by collecting the Ménard stream, up to route 139.

Lower course of the Saint-Germain river (segment of )

From route 139, the Saint-Germain river flows over:
  northeasterly, up to highway 55;
  northeasterly, up to the city limit of Drummondville;
  while crossing the city of Drummondville where it separates on  the industrial and residential sector, up to route 143;
  towards the northeast, crossing the exhibition ground, to its mouth.

Its mouth is located in the area of the golf course.

Toponymy 

The old toponyms of the river are: "Rivière Noire" and "Rivière Prévost". The variants of indigenous origin (used by the Abenaki) designating this river are: "Naskategwantekw" or Naskategwantegw, meaning "the serpentine river".

The toponym "Rivière Saint-Germain" was officially registered on December 5, 1968, at the Commission de toponymie du Québec.

See also 

 List of rivers of Quebec

References 

Rivers of Centre-du-Québec
Drummond Regional County Municipality